William Latham may refer to:

William Latham (computer scientist) (born 1961), British computer artist
William P. Latham (1917–2004), American composer
William H. Latham (1903–1987), engineer with the New York Power Authority
William H. Latham (icebreaker), a 1987 icebreaker on the Niagara River, named after the above

See also
Bill Latham (disambiguation)

Latham, William